Xiecun station, is a station of Line 7 of the Guangzhou Metro. It started operations on 28 December 2016.

Exits
Xiecun station currently has three exits, and exit C is under construction.

References

Railway stations in China opened in 2016
Guangzhou Metro stations in Panyu District